Solva may refer to:
 Solva, a village in Pembrokeshire, Wales
 River Solva, in Pembrokeshire, Wales
 Solva Group, a geological structure in Pembrokeshire, Wales
 Solva (fly), a genus in the family Xylomyidae
 Solva (Hungary), an early name for Esztergom, a city
 Flavia Solva, an ancient Roman municipium in what is now southern Austria, previously named Solva

See also
 Solfa (disambiguation)